HMS Duckworth can refer to:

 HMS Duckworth (BDE-19) a destroyer escort under construction in the US but completed in May 1943 for the USN as USS Burden R. Hastings.

Royal Navy ship names